Alexandre Durand d'Ubraye (from Alexandre Jean-Baptiste Joseph Jacques Durand d'Ubraye) (12 September 1807 – 3 August 1864) was Governor General for Inde française in the Second French Colonial Empire under Second French Empire under Napoleon III.

Biography
Son of Alexandre Jean-Baptiste Michel Durand d'Ubraye and of Marie-Pauline Riou, Alexandre Durand d'Ubraye was born in Morlaix (France).

He joined the Navy 17 December 1828 and began as Naval clerk. Firstly trainee Commissioner, then deputy Commissioner, and then Commissioner, he was Naval Commissioner General 1 June 1852.

He was appointed Governor General for Inde française in April 1857.

He died 3 August 1864 in Saint-Martin-d'Uriage (France) at the age of 56.

Honours
 Commander in the French National Order of the Legion of Honour 11 August 1855.

References

Titles Held

1807 births
1864 deaths
Governors of French India
People of the Second French Empire
People from Morlaix